The All-Ireland Senior Hurling Championship 1935 was the 49th series of the All-Ireland Senior Hurling Championship, Ireland's premier hurling knock-out competition. Kilkenny won the championship, beating Limerick 2-5 to 2-4 in the final.

Teams

A total of thirteen teams contested the championship.

The Leinster championship was once again contested by the seven strongest hurling teams in the province. The Munster championship was contested by the five strongest hurling teams as Kerry did not field a team.

Galway, who had faced no competition in the Connacht championship since 1923, once again received a bye to the All-Ireland semi-final. There were no representatives from the Ulster championship in the All-Ireland series of games.

Format

Leinster Championship

First round: (1 match) This was a single match between the first two teams drawn from the province of Leinster. One team was eliminated at this stage while the winning team advanced to the quarter-finals.

Quarter-finals: (2 matches) The winners of the lone quarter-final joined three remaining Leinster teams to make up the quarter-final pairings. Two teams were eliminated at this stage while the two winning teams advanced to the semi-finals.

Semi-finals: (2 matches) The winners of the two quarter-finals joined the two remaining Leinster teams to make up the semi-final pairings. Two teams were eliminated at this stage while the two winning teams advanced to the final.

Final: (1 match) The winners of the two semi-finals contested this game. One team was eliminated at this stage while the winning team advanced to the All-Ireland semi-final.

Munster Championship

Quarter-final: (1 match) This was a single match between the first two teams drawn from the province of Munster. One team was eliminated at this stage while the winning team advanced to the semi-finals.

Semi-finals: (2 matches) The winners of the lone quarter-final joined the three remaining Munster teams to make up the semi-final pairings. Two teams were eliminated at this stage while the two winning teams advanced to the final.

Final: (1 match) The winners of the two semi-finals contested this game. One team was eliminated at this stage while the winning team advanced to the All-Ireland final.

All-Ireland Championship

Semi-final: (1 match) The winners of the Leinster championship were drawn to play Galway, who received a bye to this stage of the championship. One team was eliminated at this stage while the winning team advanced to the final.

Final: (1 match) The winners of the lone semi-final and the Munster champions contested this game with the winners being declared All-Ireland champions.

Results

Leinster Senior Hurling Championship

Preliminary round

First round

Semi-finals

Final

Munster Senior Hurling Championship

First round

Semi-finals

Final

All-Ireland Senior Hurling Championship

Semi-final

Final

Championship statistics

Top scorers

Top scorers overall

Top scorers in a single game

Miscellaneous

 Kilkenny won their 11th All-Ireland title to draw level with Cork and Tipperary at the top of the all-time roll of honour. It was the first time that "the big three" shared the title of roll of honour leaders.

References

Sources

 Corry, Eoghan, The GAA Book of Lists (Hodder Headline Ireland, 2005).
 Donegan, Des, The Complete Handbook of Gaelic Games (DBA Publications Limited, 2005).

See also

1935
All-Ireland Senior Hurling Championship